The Born Capital Brewery Bottling Works is a historic building in the Brewery District of Columbus, Ohio. It was listed on the National Register of Historic Places in 2009.

The three-story building is the only remaining portion of Born Capital Brewery, once one of four German breweries in the area. The building was completed in 1895. It later became a Salvation Army thrift store. The structure was sold for redevelopment in 2007, and added to the National Register for tax credits in 2009. Redevelopment into apartments began around 2011. The $10 million project created 47 apartment units. The exterior was left largely unchanged, and interior beams and walls were kept.

Gallery

See also
 National Register of Historic Places listings in Columbus, Ohio

References

External links

Commercial buildings completed in 1895
Commercial buildings on the National Register of Historic Places in Ohio
National Register of Historic Places in Columbus, Ohio
Brewery District
Historic district contributing properties in Columbus, Ohio